This list is of the Places of Scenic Beauty of Japan located within the Prefecture of Miyazaki.

National Places of Scenic Beauty
As of 1 June 2019, five Places have been designated at a national level.

Prefectural Places of Scenic Beauty
As of 1 April 2019, seven Places have been designated at a prefectural level.

Municipal Places of Scenic Beauty
As of 1 May 2018, four Places have been designated at a municipal level, including:

Registered Places of Scenic Beauty
As of 1 June 2019, two Monuments have been registered (as opposed to designated) as Places of Scenic Beauty at a national level.

See also
 Cultural Properties of Japan
 List of Historic Sites of Japan (Miyazaki)
 List of parks and gardens of Miyazaki Prefecture

References

External links
  Cultural Properties of Miyazaki Prefecture

Tourist attractions in Miyazaki Prefecture
Places of Scenic Beauty